Amalia de Isaura (1887–1971) was a Spanish stage and film actress.

Selected filmography
 The Pure Truth (1931)
 Madrid Carnival (1941)
 Accompany Me (1966)
 Love in Flight (1967)
 Pepa Doncel (1969)

References

Bibliography
 Goble, Alan. The Complete Index to Literary Sources in Film. Walter de Gruyter, 1 Jan 1999.

External links

1887 births
1971 deaths
Spanish stage actresses
Spanish film actresses
Spanish silent film actresses
People from Madrid